Cristianitos Canyon Creek, a stream or arroyo, tributary to San Mateo Creek, in the Santa Ana Mountains. its source is within Orange County, California. Its source is at an altitude of 800 feet, at the head of Cristianitos Canyon, in the foothills of the Santa Ana Mountains, in Orange County.  It flows southwestward down Cristianitos Canyon, then turns south towards its confluence with San Mateo Creek, at an elevation of 75 feet, in San Diego County.

Along its course it has two major tributaries that come in from the left bank from the Santa Ana Mountains southwest and south of the Verdugo Potrero.  First Gabino Canyon Creek, 7 miles long, that arises at an elevation of 1840 feet in the Santa Ana Mountains, in the extreme southwestern part of Riverside County, a mile north of the San Diego County line and flows southwest, adding the waters of La Paz Canyon Creek on its way to its confluence with Cristianitos Creek, at the mouth of Cristianitos Cahyon, at an elevation of 301 feet in Orange County.  Second is Talega Canyon Creek, 10 miles long, that also arises in the Santa Anna Mountains, in southwestern part of Riverside County at altitude 2000 feet above sea level.  It flows southwestward into Orange County until it reaches its confluence with Cristianitos Creek at an elevation of 177 ft feet just over the county line in San Diego County, on the Marine Corps Base Camp Pendleton.

References

Cristianitos Creek
Cristianitos Creek
Cristianitos Creek
Rivers of Southern California